Gharghasht TV is a Pashto language private television station based in Khost, Afghanistan. It was officially first broadcast on October 23, 2010.

The channel can also be viewed across the border in North Waziristan, Pakistan.

See also
 List of television channels in Afghanistan

References 

Television channels and stations established in 2011
Television stations in Afghanistan
Pashto mass media
Pashto-language television stations
Mass media in Khost